Alexandru Iordan (born 17 August 1988) is a Romanian professional footballer who plays as a goalkeeper for CS Balotești.

References

External links
 

1988 births
Living people
Sportspeople from Pitești
Romanian footballers
CS Turnu Severin players
FC Dinamo București players
FC Speranța Crihana Veche players
Liga I players
Liga II players
CS Balotești players
Association football goalkeepers